Laura Ann Jacobs (born March 1, 1960 in Baltimore) is an American mixed media artist and sculptor.

Jacobs is most recognized for her mixed media series that critically addresses issues of gender identity. In her humorous yet complex ensembles, she touches on the inclination of women to succumb to society's dictates and the tragedy hidden behind the "desire to be desired". Found objects like smashed glass, broken mirrors or objects from the sea are transformed into sculptures resembling animated foundation garments, corsets, bra's and shoes. Combining both elements of sexuality and comedy, her series provokes questions on the perception and image of women in society. Her work reflects a critical response to how the aesthetics influenced by the modern porn-industry and plastic surgery have created a dual and circus-like image of female bodies and sexuality.

Jacobs graduated from San Francisco State University and attended post graduate studies at the Academy of Art University and California College of Arts and Crafts. She lives and works in San Francisco and Palm Beach, FL.

Recent Exhibitions 
2016     ANEW Museum  Galleries "Laura Ann Jacobs" Fort Lauderdale, FL
2015     Nina Torres Gallery "Art Fusion" Miami, FL
2014     Sculpt Miami "Laura Ann Jacobs" Miami, FL
2013     Kavachnina Gallery "Art Basel Vernassage" Miami, FL
2012	 Bosi Contemporary "Eros and Thanatos" N.Y. New York
2010	 Hal Katzen "Bound to Beauty " N.Y. New York
2007	 Mark Miller "Yes Dear" N.Y.C.
2005     The Hart Gallery, Carmel, California
2005	 Karen Lynne Gallery, Boca Raton, Florida

References

External links 
 Official Website
 BOSI Contemporary

American artists
1960 births
Living people
Academy of Art University alumni